Christian Gottfried Daniel Nees von Esenbeck (14 February 1776 – 16 March 1858) was a prolific German botanist, physician, zoologist, and natural philosopher. He was a contemporary of Goethe and was born within the lifetime of Linnaeus. He described approximately 7,000 plant species (almost as many as Linnaeus himself). His last official act as president of the German Academy of Natural Scientists Leopoldina was to admit Charles Darwin as a member. He was the author of numerous monographs on botany and zoology. His best-known works deal with fungi.

Biography
Nees von Esenbeck was born in Schloss Reichenberg near Reichelsheim (Odenwald). He showed an early interest in science and, after receiving his primary education in Darmstadt, he went on to the University of Jena, obtaining his degree in biology (natural history) and medicine in 1800. He practiced as a physician for Francis I (Erbach-Erbach), but he had developed a great interest in botany during his university studies, and eventually he returned to academia. In 1816 he joined the Leopoldina Academy, which was one of the most prestigious institutions in Europe. In 1817 he was appointed professor of botany at the University of Erlangen. Three years later he became professor of natural history at the University of Bonn, where he established the Botanische Gärten der Friedrich-Wilhelms-Universität Bonn, and in 1831 he was appointed to the chair of botany at the University of Breslau. In 1818 he was elected president of the Leopoldina Academy. He continued as president of the academy for the rest of his life.
In botany he achieved notoriety for, among other things, contributions to the families Acanthaceae and Lauraceae.

He became politically active in the German revolutions of 1848–1849. In 1851 due to conflicts with the government he was deprived of his professorship and pension at Breslau. Seven years later Nees von Esenbeck died essentially penniless in Breslau. He was an older brother to botanist Theodor Friedrich Ludwig Nees von Esenbeck (1787–1837).

Honours
In 1936, botanist Wilhelm Kirschstein published Myconeesia, a genus of fungi in the family Xylariaceae and named in his honour. In 1940, botanist Pilg. published Neesiochloa is a genus of Brazilian plants in the grass family, in Nees von Esenbeck's honour. Then in 1947, botanist Margaret Rutherford Bryan Levyns published Neesenbeckia, a monotypic genus of flowering plants from South Africa, belonging to the family Cyperaceae, in Nees von Esenbeck's honour.

Works 
 Die Algen des süßen Wassers, nach ihren Entwickelungsstufen dargestellt (1814)
 Das System der Pilze und Schwämme (1816)
 Vorlesungen zur Entwickelungsgeschichte des magnetischen Schlafs und Traums (1820)
 Handbuch der Botanik. Band 1 (1820) Digital edition by the University and State Library Düsseldorf
 Handbuch der Botanik. Band 2 (1821) Digital edition by the University and State Library Düsseldorf
 Bryologia germanica (with Christian Friedrich Hornschuch und Jacob Sturm, 1823–31, 2 Bände mit 43 Tafeln)
 Plantarum, in Horto medico Bonnensi nutritarum, Icones selectae (1824) Digital edition by the University and State Library Düsseldorf  
 Agrostologia brasiliensis (1829)
 Genera Plantarum Florae Germanicae (1831–1860)
 Genera et species Asterearum (1833)
 Naturgeschichte der europäischen Lebermoose mit Erinnerungen aus dem Riesengebirge (1833-38, 4 Bände)
 Hymenopterorum Ichneumonibus affinium monographiae (1834, 2 Bände)
 System der spekulativen Philosophie, Band 1 Systema Laurinarum (1836)
 Florae Africae australioris illustration monographicae Gramineae (1841)
 Die Naturphilosophie (1841)
 De Cinnamomo disputatio (1843)
 Synopsis hepaticarum (with Carl Moritz Gottsche und Johann Lindenberg, 1844–1847)Die allgemeine Formenlehre der Natur (1852)

References

Further reading
 Jahn: Geschichte der Biologie. Spektrum 2000
 Karl Mägdefrau: Geschichte der Botanik. Fischer 1992
 Bohley, Johanna: Christian Gottfried Daniel Nees von Esenbeck: ein Lebensbild. – Stuttgart: Wissenschaftl. VG, 2003. – 
 Engelhardt, Dietrich von (Hrsg.): Christian Gottfried Nees von Esenbeck'': Politik und Naturwissenschaft in der ersten Hälfte des 19. Jahrhunderts. – Stuttgart: Wissenschaftl. VG, 2004. –

External links

 http://www.nees-von-esenbeck.de/  (German language site devoted to Nees von Esenbeck; includes extensive biography)
 

German taxonomists
 01
19th-century German zoologists
1776 births
1858 deaths
Agrostologists
Bryologists
Pteridologists
German entomologists
German mycologists
German phycologists
Botanists with author abbreviations
Presidents of the German Academy of Sciences Leopoldina
German religious humanists
University of Jena alumni
Academic staff of the University of Erlangen-Nuremberg
Academic staff of the University of Bonn
Academic staff of the University of Breslau
People from Odenwaldkreis
19th-century German botanists
Member of the Prussian National Assembly